¿Quién Quiere ser Millonario?  (English translation: Who Wants to be a Millionaire?) was a Venezuelan game show based on the British format of Who Wants to Be a Millionaire?. The show offered large cash prizes for correctly answering a series of randomized multiple-choice questions of varying difficulties. It was hosted by Eladio Lárez, and broadcast from the Teatro La Campina.

It was labeled by the Venezuelan press and critics as the best and most popular game show in the country, though the format is repeated in other Latin American countries.

Broadcast history
The show first aired on Radio Caracas Television (RCTV) from August 23, 2000 to May 23, 2007, four days before the station lost its broadcast license on May 27. The show returned to air on July 18, 2007 when RCTV became a cable television network, and ended production on January 20, 2010; the station was shut down on January 24. On May 8, 2011 it began airing on Televen as an original RCTV production. It was canceled in 2017, last broadcasting on April 2, 2017.

In 2003, a special called Jugamos Millonario was broadcast.

By 2016, the Bs.F 2 million prize equated in black market exchange to US$2,000, with competitors also borrowing clothes from Televen's studio wardrobe to appear presentable on-screen, and realistic prizes amounting to only a few dollars. Lárez's pay was also cut, and he said that the TV station was crippled by the country's crisis, but the show's producer said that for simple Venezuelans just appearing on the show was a big prize.

Format
Any legal resident of Venezuela who is over 18 and not employed by RCTV could take part, entering via phone or text-to-enter quiz called "Let's play Millionaire!". People who answered correctly would be put into a random draw to compete on the show.

"The Fastest Mind" 
The first round has the competitors all answer one question, with whoever answered correctly the fastest going on to play for money. Competitors who do not make it past this round can re-enter the show after six months, while those who do proceed must wait a year. For a time, the winners of "The Fastest Mind" won a physical prize.

"Ready to Win"
The competitor is then asked up to 15 multiple-choice questions, each worth a different amount. From 2009 there were two styles of play, one with three lifelines and one with four. In both styles of play, if the competitor answers a question correctly they will proceed to the next; if they answer incorrectly, they will win the amount of money at the last safe zone; if they retire they will win the amount of money from the previous question.

Three lifeline style of play

The three lifelines are "Phone a friend", where the competitor has 30 seconds on call to someone to help answer a question, "50/50", where the number of answer choices is reduced to two from four, and "Ask the audience", where the members of the audience each vote for which answer they believe is correct and the competitor can see all the votes. Each lifeline can only be used once, but more than one lifeline can be used per question. In this style of play, there are two safe zones, at question 5 and question 10.

Four lifeline style of play

The four lifelines include the three described above and "Ask One of the audience", where audience members who believe they know the correct answer can volunteer to help; the competitor chooses one to explain what they think the right answer is and why. Initially, if the audience member was correct, they also won up to Bs.F 3  This fourth lifeline could only be used once and only after question 5. It also removed the second safe zone, leaving only the one at question 5.

Prizes 
The prizes were:

 In 2008, the prize was modified according to the monetary conversion to the hard bolívar.
 In 2014, the physical prize given by advertisers for using the "Phone a friend" lifeline was stopped.
 In 2015, the show stopped giving a car to grand prize winners.

References

Who Wants to Be a Millionaire?
2000 Venezuelan television series debuts
2007 Venezuelan television series endings
2010 Venezuelan television series debuts
RCTV original programming
2017 Venezuelan television series endings